The Institute of Traffic Accident Investigators (sometimes abbreviated to "ITAI") is a road safety organisation.

History
It was formed in 1988.

Structure
It publishes the journal IMPACT three times a year, and the newsletter CONTACT every two months.

It is based near the Column Roundabout, on the A5064 "London Road" in Shrewsbury, near Shropshire Council's Shirehall and the Lord Hill's Column.

Function
It regulates, in a voluntary way, the practice of traffic accident investigation.

Arms

See also
Institute of Professional Investigators

References

External links
ITAI
Parliamentary Advisory Council for Traffic Safety

Road incidents in the United Kingdom
Organizations established in 1988
Organisations based in Shropshire
Shrewsbury
Transport charities based in the United Kingdom